Kurumkan (Buryat and , Khuramkhaan) is a rural locality (a selo) and the administrative center of Kurumkansky District of the Republic of Buryatia, Russia, located  from Ulan-Ude. Population:

Etymology
The name "Kurumkan" comes from the Evenk language and means a stone river.

Geography 
Kurumkan is located by the Barguzin River, with the Barguzin Range rising to the west.

Transportation
There is a bus that runs twice a day between Ulan-Ude and Kurumkan.

References

Rural localities in Kurumkansky District